Corythornis is a genus of small African river kingfishers.

A molecular phylogenetic study of the alcedinine kingfishers published in 2007 found that the genera as then defined did not form monophyletic groups. The species were subsequently rearranged into four genera, with four species in the resurrected genus Corythornis. The genus had been introduced by the German naturalist Johann Jakob Kaup in 1848. The type species is the Príncipe kingfisher (Alcedo cristatus nais).  Corythornis is the sister group to the genus Ispidina containing two small African kingfishers.

Species
The genus contains the following four species:

References

Further reading
 

 
Alcedininae
Bird genera